Berta García Faet (born 1988, Valencia) is a Spanish poet, translator, and scholar of Hispanic Literature.

Life and work
Berta García Faet has published seven books of poetry in Spanish, most recently, in 2021, Una pequeña personalidad linda and in 2018, Corazón tradicionalista. Poesía 2008-2011, both with La Bella Varsovia, edited by Elena Medel. García Faet is also the author of the books Los salmos fosforitos (Fluorescent Psalms, La Bella Varsovia, 2017), La edad de merecer (The Eligible Age, La Bella Varsovia, 2015), Fresa y herida (Strawberry and Wound, Diputación de León, 2011), Introducción a todo (Introduction to Everything, La Bella Varsovia, 2011), Night club para alumnas aplicadas (Nightclub for Studious Schoolgirls, Vitruvio, 2009), and Manojo de abominaciones (A Bunch of Abominations, Ayuntamiento de Avilés, 2008).

She has won the following prizes: Premio Nacional de Poesía “Antonio González de Lama,” 2010; IV Premio de Poesía Joven “Pablo García Baena,” 2011; VII Premio Nacional de Poesía “Ciega de Manzanares,” 2009; XVI Premio de Poesía “Ana de Valle,” 2008.

García Faet has studied at the University of Valencia, Pompeu Fabra University, and the City College of New York; she is currently a doctoral candidate in Hispanic Studies at Brown University.

The Eligible Age
The Eligible Age is an English translation of García Faet's La edad de merecer by U.S. American translator Kelsi Vanada. Unai Velasco calls it "one of the most significant books of the last few years...Berta García Faet has become the most representative voice of her generation." The first of García Faet's books to be translated into English, The Eligible Age was published by independent press Song Bridge Press in 2018.

In a review of the translation, reviewer Laura Wetherington writes, "The Eligible Age does not disappoint, which is to say it’s equally complex, surprising, and funny."

Bibliography
Manojo de abominaciones, 2008
Night club para alumnas aplicadas, 2009
Introducción a todo, 2011
Fresa y herida, 2011
La edad de merecer, 2015
 Los salmos fosforitos, 2017
Corazón tradicionalista. Poesía 2008-2011, 2018
The Eligible Age, 2018 (in English)
Una pequeña personalidad linda, 2021

References 

1988 births
Living people
Spanish women poets
Pompeu Fabra University alumni
University of Valencia alumni
City College of New York alumni
Brown University alumni
21st-century Spanish women writers
21st-century Spanish poets